The Bruce Freeman Rail Trail is a partially-completed rail trail in Massachusetts. The path is a  paved multi-use trail, available for walking, running, biking, rollerblading, and other non-motorized uses.  It follows the right-of-way of the disused Framingham and Lowell Line of the New York, New Haven and Hartford Railroad.  The constructed route connects with the Bay Circuit Trail, and Phase 2D will connect with the Mass Central Rail Trail. The total planned length of the trail—which will eventually run continuously between Lowell and Framingham—is just under .

The trail is divided into several phases of construction:
Phase 1:  in Lowell (starting at Cross Point Towers), Chelmsford, and Westford (ending at Route 225). This segment opened on August 29, 2009. In 2019, the state awarded $180,000 for construction of a short connecting trail under the Lowell Connector.
Phase 2: 
Phase 2A:  through Westford, Carlisle, and Acton (Route 225) to just north of Route 2). This segment began construction in June 2015 and opened on April 3, 2018.
Phase 2B:  in Acton and Concord, set to open in mid 2022 with a bridge spanning MA Route 2.
Phase 2C:  from Commonwealth Avenue to Powder Mill Road in Concord, with a short discontinuity at West Concord station. This $7.2 million segment began construction in July 2017 and opened on September 27, 2019. An additional  from Powder Mill Road to the Concord/Sudbury town line will be added later.
Phase 2D:  in Sudbury from the town line to the Mass Central Rail Trail, with construction expected to begin in late 2022.
Phase 3:  from the Mass Central Rail Trail to Route 9 in Framingham. This section of the right-of-way is still owned by CSX Transportation. Framingham and Sudbury were awarded $648,000 in state grants in 2022 to design Phase 3.

References

External links

 Friends of the Bruce Freeman Rail Trail

Protected areas of Middlesex County, Massachusetts
Rail trails in Massachusetts